Catocala luciana, the shining underwing, is a moth of the family Erebidae. The species was first described by Herman Strecker in 1874. It is found in western North America, as far east as Minnesota and Illinois and northward into extreme southern Alberta and Saskatchewan. It occurs widely across the Great Plains, south to New Mexico, Arizona and California.

The wingspan is 63–68 mm. Adults are on wing from August to October depending on the location.

References

External links

luciana
Moths of North America
Moths described in 1874